William Devlin Watters (born 5 June 1964) is a Scottish former carpet fitter and part-time footballer who played for Hamilton Academical, Clyde, St Johnstone, Kilmarnock, Queen of the South, Stirling Albion, Alloa Athletic, Arbroath, Albion Rovers, Stenhousemuir and Dumbarton.

References

1964 births
Scottish footballers
Footballers from Bellshill
Dumbarton F.C. players
Hamilton Academical F.C. players
Clyde F.C. players
St Johnstone F.C. players
Kilmarnock F.C. players
Queen of the South F.C. players
Stirling Albion F.C. players
Arbroath F.C. players
Albion Rovers F.C. players
Stenhousemuir F.C. players
Alloa Athletic F.C. players
Scottish Football League players
Living people
Association football forwards